The 2004 Copa Petrobras Santiago was a professional tennis tournament played on outdoor red clay courts. It was part of the 2004 ATP Challenger Series. It took place in Santiago, Chile between 1 and 7 November 2004.

ATP entrants

Seeds

 Rankings are as of October 25, 2004.

Other entrants
The following players received wildcards into the singles main draw:
  Diego Cubas
  Guillermo Hormazábal
  Emiliano Massa
  Julio Peralta

The following players received entry from the qualifying draw:
  Francisco Cabello
  Diego Moyano
  Marko Neunteibl
  Fernando Vicente

Champions

Singles

 Óscar Hernández def.  Nicolás Lapentti, 7–6(7–4), 6–4

Doubles

 Enzo Artoni /  Ignacio González King def.  Brian Dabul /  Damián Patriarca, 6–3, 6–0

External links
Copa Petrobras de Tênis official website
ITF Search 
2004 Draws

Clay court tennis tournaments
Copa Petrobras Santiago
Copa